Christophe Dessimoz is a Swiss National Science Foundation (SNSF) Professor at the University of Lausanne, Associate Professor at University College London and a group leader at the Swiss Institute of Bioinformatics. He was awarded the Overton Prize in 2019 for his contributions to computational biology. Starting in April 2022, he will be joint executive director of the SIB Swiss Institute of Bioinformatics, along with Ron Appel.

Education
Dessimoz obtained his Master of Science degree in 2003 and PhD in Computer Science in 2009 from ETH Zurich in Switzerland where his doctoral research was supervised by Gaston Gonnet and examined by Amos Bairoch.

Career and research
After postdoctoral research at the European Bioinformatics Institute (EBI) on the Wellcome Genome Campus in Hinxton, Cambridgeshire, he joined University College London (UCL) as lecturer  in 2013, and was promoted to Reader in 2015. In 2015, he joined the University of Lausanne as  professor, retaining an appointment at UCL. Since 2016, Dessimoz has served as group leader at the Swiss Institute of Bioinformatics where his research interests are in bioinformatics, genomics, phylogenetics, evolution and computational biology.

Dessimoz is known for his management of the Orthologous MAtrix (OMA) which provides information on orthologous proteins. OMA has important applications in protein function prediction. Dessimoz's approach to benchmarking had a major impact on three key subfields of computational biology: orthology inference, sequence alignment, and the gene ontology (GO).

Awards and honours
Dessimoz was awarded the Overton Prize by the International Society for Computational Biology (ISCB) in 2019 for outstanding contributions to computational biology.

References

Swiss bioinformaticians
1980 births
Living people
ETH Zurich alumni
Academic staff of the University of Lausanne